Mamita Zuma, «Cyrille» (born 25 November 1988) is a DR Congolese football manager and retired player who played as a centre-forward. She has captained the DR Congo women's national team.

Early life
Zuma was born in Kinshasa.

Club career
Zuma started in 2003. She has played for Mbilinga de Matete and Grand Hôtel in the Democratic Republic of the Congo, for La Source and La Colombe in the Republic of the Congo, for Progresso do Sambizanga in Angola and for Bayelsa Queens in Nigeria. She retired in 2013.

International career
Zuma was capped for the DR Congo at senior level during the 2006 African Women's Championship.

International goals
Scores and results list DR Congo's goal tally first

See also
 List of Democratic Republic of the Congo women's international footballers

References

1988 births
Living people
Footballers from Kinshasa
Democratic Republic of the Congo women's footballers
Women's association football forwards
Bayelsa Queens F.C. players
Democratic Republic of the Congo women's international footballers
Democratic Republic of the Congo expatriate footballers
Democratic Republic of the Congo expatriate sportspeople in the Republic of the Congo
Expatriate footballers in the Republic of the Congo
Democratic Republic of the Congo expatriate sportspeople in Angola
Expatriate footballers in Angola
Democratic Republic of the Congo expatriate sportspeople in Nigeria
Expatriate footballers in Nigeria
Democratic Republic of the Congo football managers
Female association football managers
Women's association football managers
21st-century Democratic Republic of the Congo people